WCMA (1600 AM, "Zona 96") is a radio station broadcasting a Spanish variety format. Licensed to Bayamón, Puerto Rico, it serves all of Puerto Rico. The station is currently owned by Aurio A. Matos Barreto. WCMA shares with translator station W241DE (96.1 FM), also licensed to Bayamón. The station was originally known as WLUZ, founded by Puerto Rican producer Tommy Muñiz after the original owner's wife, Luz María García de la Noceda.

Translator stations

References

External links

 
 

CMA
Radio stations established in 1966
1966 establishments in Puerto Rico
Bayamón, Puerto Rico